Chalupáři (The Cottagers) is a Czechoslovak comedy TV series filmed in 1974 and 1975 by František Filip.

Plot

When former supervisor Evžen Huml, now on disability pension, returns from the spa to the small flat where he lives with the rest of his family in the small room behind the bathroom, he decides to move out of Prague to the peaceful countryside. He buys a cottage in the village of Třešňová, but there is one problem — there is still one former tenant in his dream cottage, Bohouš Císař, a pensioner too, who doesn't want to leave. Their adventures begin.

External links
 IMDB Entry

Czechoslovak television series
1975 Czechoslovak television series debuts
Czech comedy television series
1970s Czechoslovak television series
Czechoslovak Television original programming